Cirò can refer to:

Cirò, Calabria, an Italian comune in the province of Crotone
Cirò Marina, an Italian comune in the province of Crotone
Cirò (wine), a wine made in the environs of Cirò

See also
Ciro (disambiguation)
Ćiro, a given name